Thomas Clark Cogbill (April 8, 1932 – December 7, 1982) was an American bassist, guitarist and record producer known for his work in R&B, soul and country music.

Life and career 
Cogbill was born in Johnson Grove, Tennessee. He was a highly sought-after session and studio musician who appeared on many now-classic recordings of the 1960s and 1970s, especially those recorded in Nashville, Memphis and Muscle Shoals. He has been credited as an influence by many bass guitarists, including Jerry Jemmott & Jaco Pastorius. In the late 1960s and early 1970s Cogbill worked as a record producer at American Sound Studio in Memphis and was part of the studio's house rhythm section, known as the Memphis Boys.

One of the best-known recordings featuring his bassline was Dusty Springfield's 1969 hit "Son of a Preacher Man", produced by Jerry Wexler and Tom Dowd. Other major artists he recorded with include King Curtis, Joe Tex, Elvis Presley, Aretha Franklin (Cogbill played the bassline on "Chain of Fools"), Dobie Gray, Kris Kristofferson, J. J. Cale, Wilson Pickett (Cogbill played the bassline on "Funky Broadway"), Chuck Berry, Dolly Parton, Bob Seger, and Neil Diamond. He also played bass on King Curtis's single "Memphis Soul Stew" in 1967.  He also played bass on "Everlasting Love" by Carl Carlton, a hit in 1974.

Cogbill died of a stroke on December 7, 1982, in Nashville, aged 50.

Discography, albums 

 The Exciting Wilson Pickett, Wilson Pickett, 1966
The Sound of Wilson Pickett, Wilson Pickett, 1967
Wicked Pickett, Wilson Pickett, 1967
Aretha Arrives, Aretha Franklin, 1967
I Never Loved a Man the Way I Love You, Aretha Franklin, 1967
For Your Precious Love, Oscar Toney Jr., 1967
 Lady Soul, Aretha Franklin, 1968Aretha Now, Aretha Franklin, 1968
Aretha '69, Aretha Franklin, 1969
 From Elvis in Memphis, Elvis Presley, 1969
 From Memphis to Vegas/From Vegas to Memphis, Elvis Presley, 1969
 Dusty in Memphis, Dusty Springfield, 1969
 Memphis Underground, Herbie Mann, 1969
 Spills the Beans, Joe Tex, 1972
 Raised on Rock, Elvis Presley, 1973
 Good Times (Elvis Presley album), Elvis Presley, 1974
 Seven, Bob Seger, 1974
 Michael Murphey (album), Michael Martin Murphey, 1974
 Okie,  J. J.Cale, 1974
 Hey Dixie, Dobie Gray, 1974
 You and Me Together, James and Bobby Purify, 1975
 Easy as Pie, Bily "Crash" Craddock, 1976
 So Lonesome Tonight, Charlie Rich, 1977
 Crash, Bily "Crash" Craddock, 1977
 Starting All Over Again, Don Gibson, 1978
 Where to Now, Charlie Dore, 1979
 Slow Dancing, Ben Moore, 1979
 At This Moment, Billy Bera & the Beaters, 1981
 Hollywood, Tennessee, Crystal Gayle, 1981

 Discography, songs 

 Collaborations 
 The Exciting Wilson Pickett - Wilson Pickett (1966)
 The Wicked Pickett - Wilson Pickett (1967)
 I Never Loved a Man the Way I Love You - Aretha Franklin (1967)
 The Sound of Wilson Pickett - Wilson Pickett (1967)
 Aretha Arrives - Aretha Franklin (1967)
 I'm in Love - Wilson Pickett (1968)
 King Solomon - Solomon Burke (1968)
 Lady Soul - Aretha Franklin (1968)
 I Wish I Knew - Solomon Burke (1968)
 Aretha Now - Aretha Franklin (1968)
 Dusty in Memphis - Dusty Springfield (1969)
 Soul '69 - Aretha Franklin (1969)
 Soulful - Dionne Warwick (1969)
 Hey Now Hey (The Other Side of the Sky) - Aretha Franklin (1973)
 Giant of Rock 'n' Roll - Ronnie Hawkins (1974)
 Michael Murphey - Michael Martin Murphey (1974)
 Living and Dying in 3/4 Time - Jimmy Buffett (1974)
 Seven - Bob Seger (1974)
 A1A - Jimmy Buffett (1974)
 Okie - J. J. Cale (1974)
 Regeneration - Roy Orbison (1976)
 Troubadour - J. J. Cale (1976)
 When I Dream - Crystal Gayle (1978)
 Love Has No Reason - Debby Boone (1980)
 These Days - Crystal Gayle (1980)
 Shades - J. J. Cale (1981)
 Hollywood, Tennessee - Crystal Gayle (1981)
 Grasshopper - J. J. Cale (1982)
 True Love - Crystal Gayle (1982)
 Burlap & Satin'' - Dolly Parton (1983)

See also 
 Southern soul
 R&B
 Soul music
 Country

References

External links 
Bass Player – Online edition

1932 births
1982 deaths
Musicians from Nashville, Tennessee
American rhythm and blues bass guitarists
American country bass guitarists
American session musicians
20th-century American bass guitarists
Musicians from Memphis, Tennessee
Record producers from Tennessee
American male bass guitarists
Songwriters from Tennessee
Guitarists from Tennessee
Country musicians from Tennessee
20th-century American male musicians
American male songwriters
The Memphis Boys members